The Coventry Building Society Arena (often shortened to the CBS Arena or just simply Coventry Arena, and formerly known as the Ricoh Arena) is a complex in Coventry, England. It includes a 32,609-seater stadium which is currently home to football team, Championship club Coventry City F.C. along with facilities which include a  exhibition hall, a hotel and a casino. The site is also home to Arena Park Shopping Centre, containing one of UK's largest Tesco Extra hypermarkets. Built on the site of the Foleshill gasworks, it is named after its sponsor, Coventry Building Society who entered into a ten-year sponsorship deal in 2021. For the 2012 Summer Olympics, where stadium naming sponsorship was forbidden, the stadium was known as the City of Coventry Stadium.

Originally built as a replacement for Coventry City's Highfield Road ground, the stadium was initially owned and operated by Arena Coventry Limited (ACL), with Coventry City as tenants. ACL was owned jointly by Coventry City Council and the Higgs Charity.

Following a protracted rent dispute between Coventry City and ACL, the football club left the arena in 2013; playing their home matches in Northampton for over a year before returning in September 2014. Within two months, both shareholders in ACL were bought out by rugby union Premiership Rugby club Wasps, who relocated to the stadium from their previous ground, Adams Park in High Wycombe. A further dispute with Wasps prior to the 2019–20 season saw Coventry City leave the Ricoh for a further two seasons. In March 2021, Wasps and Coventry City agreed to a ten-year deal to return to the arena and the city of Coventry. The deal became null and void with the Frasers Group's purchase of the arena.

The stadium was the first cashless stadium in the United Kingdom, with customers using a prepay smartcard system in the ground's bars and shops. However, the stadium now accepts cash at all kiosks.

History

Planning a new stadium 

The decision to move Coventry City F.C. from Highfield Road to a new stadium – with a larger capacity and better road links and parking facilities – was made in 1997 by the club's then chairman Bryan Richardson. It was anticipated that the new stadium would be ready for the 2000–01 season. Permission for the construction of a 45,000-seater stadium was given in the spring of 1999, with a targeted completion date of August 2001. However, the stadium was delivered four years behind schedule, and was more basic than anticipated in the original plans.

Coventry were one out of three cities to bid for England's new national stadium along with London and Birmingham. In 2001, Nick Nolan, the leader of Coventry City Council, claimed that their proposal was always the strongest as the construction could be completed within three years. The council's plan was to build a 90,000 all-seater stadium for an estimated cost of £250 million. However, it was decided that Wembley, London would remain the location for the national stadium.

The original design for the arena was for a state-of-the-art stadium with a retractable roof and a pitch that could slide out to reveal a hard floor for concerts. After Coventry City's relegation from the Premiership in May 2001, a number of contractor/financier withdrawals, and England's bid to host the 2006 FIFA World Cup ending in failure, the plans were significantly downsized to reflect new realities. By the summer of 2002 there were plans for a more basic 32,500-seat stadium in its place.

Naming of the stadium 
The arena's first name, 'The Ricoh Arena' came from a multi-year sponsorship deal, reported to be worth £10 million with camera and photocopier manufacturer Ricoh. During construction the stadium was variously referred to as the Jaguar Arena, Arena Coventry and Arena 2000.

The sponsorship deal with Ricoh came about after the stadium's initial sponsor, luxury car manufacturer Jaguar, was forced to pull out because of the commercial difficulties that had caused the controversial closure of the large Jaguar assembly plant at the city's Brown's Lane, previously a major source of employment in Coventry. On 4 August 2004, 12 months before the stadium's opening, it had been announced that the new stadium would be called the Jaguar Arena in a deal worth up to £7 million until 2015. However, the deal was cancelled on 17 December 2004. Jaguar did however retain naming rights to the Arena's Exhibition Hall. Ricoh's sponsorship of the new stadium was confirmed on 26 April 2005.

On 5 May 2021, it was announced that the venue would be renamed the Coventry Building Society Arena. The name change came into effect in summer 2021 as a part of a 10-year naming rights deal with the UK's second largest building society.

Wasps Holdings and CBS Arena Enter Administration: 2022 

On 17 October 2022 it was confirmed that Wasps Holdings, the holding company for Wasps and Wasps Netball had entered administration. They ceased trading immediately and all playing and coaching staff were made redundant. Although the stadium operator Arena Coventry Ltd. were not included in the administration, they filed a notice of intention to appoint an administrator. On 2 November 2022, it was confirmed that stadium operator Arena Coventry Limited had also applied to enter administration. Initially all scheduled events would take place as scheduled. The administration hearing took place on 17 November where it was confirmed that the arena would enter administration but also immediately fall into the ownership of Frasers Group (owned by Mike Ashley) who had a pre-signed deal to immediately take over the stadium should it fall into administration.

Football at the arena

Coventry City 

The stadium hosted its first football match in August 2005. The official opening was performed by Dame Kelly Holmes and sports minister Richard Caborn on 24 February 2007, by which time the arena had already hosted a sell-out England U21 football match against Germany as well as a full season of Coventry City matches.

The arena became the venue for Coventry City's home games at the start of the 2005–06 season, following 106 years at the Highfield Road stadium. The first competitive football match played at the stadium was against Queens Park Rangers on 20 August 2005, in front of a reduced (for safety reasons) 23,012 capacity crowd. The game ended 3–0 to Coventry, with Claus Bech Jørgensen becoming the first player to score at the arena. Hull City became the first away team to win at the Ricoh, easing their way to a 2–0 win on 24 September 2005, with both goals coming from John Welsh.

The stadium has never seen a capacity 32,600 crowd for a Coventry City match but 2009 saw their highest attendance coming against Chelsea in an FA Cup quarter-final in 2009. The attendance was 31,407.

In December 2009, the first hat-trick was scored at the venue when Freddy Eastwood scored three past Peterborough United. Eastwood grabbed two goals before half-time before Craig Mackail-Smith netted a brace in the second half to level the scoring. However, Coventry City secured three points in the Championship fixture after Eastwood grabbed the final goal of the fixture just a minute after Peterborough levelled. Freddy Eastwood remained the only player to have scored a hat-trick at the Ricoh Arena until Coventry City loanee Jacob Murphy scored a first-half hat-trick in a League One fixture against Gillingham on 21 November 2015.

On 28 July 2011, a bronze statue of Jimmy Hill was unveiled at the entrance to the stadium after £100,000 was raised by Coventry City fans. He managed the club from 1961 to 1967 and was responsible for guiding it to the top flight. Despite this, Hill decided to resign as manager for a career in television but later returned to the Sky Blues as managing director before becoming chairman. When he died in December 2015, fans paid tribute by placing flowers and scarves by and around the statue.

The quickest ever goal scored at the ground was when Coventry striker Dan Agyei converted against Northampton Town after 19.5 seconds on 4 October 2016. This beat the previous record scored by Reading's Grzegorz Rasiak after 27 seconds in 2009, when Reading defeated Coventry 3–1. Rasiak's goal still remains the fastest one scored by an away side at the stadium.

Rent dispute (2012–13) 
In December 2012, Coventry City owners SISU Capital became embroiled in a high-profile dispute with ACL over the rent arrangement and a lack of access to matchday revenue. The previously agreed rent amounted to £1.2 million per year, but did not give Coventry City access to matchday revenue.

A deadline of 27 December 2012 was given by ACL for unpaid rent. After the deadline passed, a winding up order was enforced through the High Court. Subsequently, after ACL planned to place Coventry City FC Ltd into administration, the club itself entered administration, accepting a 10-point penalty from the Football League as a consequence. A further 10-point penalty was incurred when ACL refused to accept the terms of a company voluntary arrangement (CVA) proposed by the administrator. Coventry City Football Club has since been bought by Otium Entertainment Group.

On 23 March 2013, Coventry City moved all its staff and club shop stock from the venue after a long dispute over rent and access to matchday revenue with the club.

Coventry City agreed to play their home games at Northampton Town's Sixfields Stadium to ensure that they fulfilled their fixtures. This resulted in ACL threatening to sue Northampton Town if they decided to carry on hosting Coventry City's home games. Northampton Town released a club statement saying that they "will not be bullied or threatened". ACL subsequently withdrew  its legal action against Northampton Town.

Second stint at the arena (2014–19) 
ACL and Sisu agreed a two-year deal to bring Coventry City back to the arena in 2014. The club also had the option to play there for a further two years; they played their first match back at the stadium on 5 September 2014 against Gillingham. This followed a payment of £470,000 from SISU Capital to ACL after a Football League ruling. The deal was later extended by a year. This meant Coventry City remained at the Ricoh Arena until May 2019 before ground-sharing for two seasons with Birmingham City at St Andrew's.

Third stint at the arena (2021–) 
On 10 March 2021, It was announced that Coventry City and Wasps had agreed to a ten-year deal, which would mean that the club would return to the stadium from the 2021–22 season. The club still intend to build a new stadium on land near the University of Warwick on the southern edge of the city, as a break clause in their contract will allow them to leave the Ricoh for their new stadium. Their first game back was a pre-season friendly on 1 August against Wolverhampton Wanderers in which Coventry lost 2–1. 

With the administration of Wasps and subsequent transfer of ownership of the Coventry Building Society Arena Coventry City's deal became null and void and the club did not sign to continue the deal with Frasers Group. Frasers Group issued the football club with a notice of eviction on 5 December should they chose to not sign a new deal running until May 2023. Coventry City signed the deal on 13 December agreeing to stay at the arena until at least May 2023.

International football 
The venue hosted two England under-21 internationals. The first was a 2007 European U-21 Championship qualification Play off match against Germany's under-21s on 5 October 2006. The hosts edged out the visitors 1 – 0 thanks to Leighton Baines seventy seventh-minute goal. The other was a 2011 UEFA European Under-21 Championship qualification Group 9 match against Macedonia's under-21s on 9 October 2009. The hosts beat the visitors 6 – 3 with Kieran Gibbs, Micah Richards, Andy Carroll (2) and Zavon Hines (2) grabbing the six goals scored by the victors.

On 17 May 2007, England U-19 team played their home fixture against Netherlands U-19 team in the Elite qualifying group round. Netherlands won the game 2–1.

2012 Olympics 

The venue also became host to 2012 Olympic Football Matches, where the stadium hosted 12 tournament matches. The stadium was temporarily renamed to City of Coventry Stadium due to sponsorships on venue names not being allowed by the International Olympic Committee. In preparation for the Olympics, a test event on 23 April 2012 saw Oman play Senegal in the Olympic Qualifier 'play-offs'. Senegal won 2–0 and took the final place in the men's 2012 Olympic draw. The first Olympic match, on 25 July 2012, was between Japan and Canada in Group F of the women's tournament. On 9 August 2012, the bronze medal game was held between France and Canada at City of Coventry Stadium. Canada won the bronze medal in a 1–0 stoppage time victory on a goal from Diana Matheson.

Other football events 
The stadium has also hosted the 2011 Women's FA Cup final, which was played between Arsenal and Bristol Academy. 13,885 watched Arsenal win their eleventh FA Cup as they ran out as 2–0 winners.

During Coventry City's absence, Football Conference Youth Alliance Midland Division side Football CV Reds agreed to play eight games at the stadium in January 2014. Leicester City's under-21 development squad played twice at the Arena on 29 January 2014 and 3 February 2014 due to waterlogged pitches at the original venues. The first game was behind closed doors but the second game against Manchester United was open to the public.

In August 2014 it was announced that Coventry City Ladies would be moving to the stadium for the 2014–15 season. However the team had to return to the Oval in Bedworth during the season after Wasps' purchase of the arena.

Rugby Union at the arena

Before Wasps' relocation 
On 22 April 2007, the arena hosted its first ever rugby union match when Northampton Saints hosted Wasps (then known as London Wasps in an all-English Heineken Cup Semi-Final affair. 16,186 fans saw Saints Captain Bruce Reihana score the first ever try at the stadium but the London Wasps came from behind to win 30–13 to secure a place in the final.

London Wasps again played at the arena, this time hosting Irish side Munster on 10 November 2007 in a Heineken Cup fixture. Wasps narrowly won 24–23. The stadium hosted another Heienken Cup semi-final in the same season when Saracens chose it as their venue to play Munster. It was a close encounter that saw Munster win by two points with a score of 18–16.

On 28 March 2009, the arena hosted the EDF Energy Cup semi-finals. The first semi-final saw Gloucester beat their Welsh opponents Ospreys with a score of 17–0. A total of 26,744 people turned up with them also witnessing Cardiff Blues beat Northampton Saints 11–5.

The arena was one of several venues that put in a bid to host Rugby World Cup matches in 2015 as England were announced as hosts on 28 July 2009. However, the venue was unsuccessful in their bid with Villa Park and the Leicester City Stadium becoming the chosen venues within the Midlands to host tournament matches.

Wasps 
In September 2014, Simon Gilbert of the Coventry Telegraph broke the news that Wasps (formerly London Wasps) were in talks to permanently relocate to the arena, from their home at Adams Park, in High Wycombe. In October 2014 Wasps announced that from December 2014 they would play their home games at the Coventry Building Society Arena. On 14 November 2014 Wasps confirmed the purchase of the final 50% of shares in the stadium from the Higgs Charity to become outright owners of the facility.

After Wasps purchased the remaining 50% from the Alan Edward Higgs Charity in November 2014, the club announced that the north stand would be renamed "The Higgs Charity Stand", and added that 50 pence would be donated to the charity from each ticket sold in that stand.

Wasps played their first home match as owners at the stadium against London Irish on 21 December 2014. The match saw Coventry-born Andy Goode set a Premiership Rugby record with the most points scored in a single match with a total of 33. It was not the only record broken at the time as the attendance of 28,254 meant it was the largest attendance at a Rugby Premiership match at a recognised home ground.

The Rugby Premiership attendance record was broken again when Leicester Tigers came to the arena. The overall attendance was 32,019 meaning it was the highest attendance at the stadium for a sporting event as well as the largest attendance at a Rugby Premiership match at a recognised home ground. Leicester Tigers beat Wasps by a score of 26–21 on their first trip to the stadium.

Samoa became the first international side to play at the stadium in a Rugby World Cup warm-up match when they faced Wasps on 5 September 2015.

Wasps recorded their biggest ever win in the Champions Cup on 15 October 2016 when they defeated Italian side Zebre 82-14 after scoring 12 tries.

On 28 November 2022 all external Wasps signage was removed from the stadium confirming the end of their association with the stadium.

Other sporting events at the arena

The arena was selected to host the Great Britain versus Russia Group One second round tie of the 2013 Davis Cup tennis competition on 5–7 April. Great Britain earned a shock 3–2 victory over Russia after they were trailing 2–0 in the tie. On Friday 5 April, Russia's Dmitry Tursunov beat Great Britain's Dan Evans and Evgeny Donskoy defeated James Ward, which meant Russia were 2–0 up after Friday's ties. On Saturday 6 April, Great Britain won the double pairs match as Colin Fleming and Jonny Marray won against Igor Kunitsyn and Victor Baluda. On Sunday 7 April, Great Britain completed the comeback when James Ward got the win against Dmitry Tursunov and Dan Evans achieved victory against Evgeny Donskoy.

After the revival of the Champion of Champions snooker tournament, the arena was chosen as the venue for its first tournament since 1980. After a successful event, The Coventry Building Society Arena became the annual venue for the competition until 2019 after hosting it again in 2014 as well as 2015.

Premier League Darts was held at the venue on two occasions with the first being on 21 February 2008 and the second being on 19 February 2009. Due to the rising demand for tickets in the PDC, it has not been a venue to audiences since. The venue has other minor PDC tournaments and those without audiences during the COVID-19 pandemic, as well as BDO competitions.

The stadium hosted its first-ever American football game on 6 May 2007, when the Coventry Cassidy Jets beat then British national champions London Olympians 27–20. The Jets had hoped to play their inaugural EFAF Cup game against Madrid Bears on 29 April but they were forced to change venue to the Manor Park Stadium in Nuneaton. The Heineken Cup the previous week to the Madrid game had led to CCFC objecting in case of damage to the pitch.

The stadium hosted a rugby league fixture for the first time when the Coventry Bears took on the Keighley Cougars at the stadium on 8 May 2016 in a League 1 encounter.

A record home crowd for the Coventry Bears of 1,097 watched the side lose to the Cougars. The arena also hosted a 2016 Rugby League Four Nations double-header in November as England defeated Scotland and Australia defeated New Zealand at the stadium in front of 21,009 people.

The arena held the rugby sevens, wrestling and judo events at the 2022 Commonwealth Games.

Other events at the arena
The first concert held at the arena was by Bryan Adams on 23 September 2005. The bar in the Eon Lounge, overlooking the pitch, was named The Bryan Adams Bar after the Canadian rocker.
Almost 40,000 people saw Oasis play a concert at the stadium on 7 July 2009. 
Scouting for Girls performed on 30 November 2008, in the Ericsson Exhibition Hall.
Coldplay performed a sold-out show at the venue on 29 May 2012 as part of their Mylo Xyloto Tour.
Bruce Springsteen and the E Street Band performed a concert to a sell-out crowd of 37,262 on 20 June 2013 as part of their Wrecking Ball Tour. They performed again on 3 June 2016 as part of their The River 2016 Tour in front of a sold-out crowd of 36,588 people.
Multiplay's Insomnia Festival was hosted at the Ricoh Stadium until 2016 when it moved to the NEC.
Rihanna performed at the stadium as a part of her Anti World Tour on 25 June 2016.
MTV Crashes came to the venue on Friday 27 May and Saturday 28 May 2016, which included Chase & Status and Kaiser Chiefs on the first night while the second night was headlined by The Chainsmokers as part of Club MTV.
On Thursday 17 November 2016, Catfish and the Bottlemen performed to a sellout crowd in the Ericsson Exhibition Hall.
On Saturday 2 June 2018 the Rolling Stones played the Arena as part of their No Filter Tour, Mick Jagger and the crowd sang Happy Birthday to Charlie Watts who was celebrating his 77th Birthday.
The Spice Girls performed for two nights at the arena, including one sold-out concert, on 3 and 4 June 2019 as part of their Spice World – 2019 Tour.

Stands

North Stand 
When the ground first opened, the stand was known as the Coventry Evening Telegraph stand and was the main stand for Coventry City supporters that sang during games. After the sponsorship deal ran out for the stand, it became known as the North Stand but then renamed again after the Wasps' purchase of the Alan Higgs Charity share of Arena Coventry Limited. After attendances dropping due to boycotts against the ownership, Coventry City announced that for the 2014–15 season that the stand would be closed for football matches due to costs but would be opened if the demand is there, however tickets could still be bought there for Wasps' fixtures. Coventry City have reopened the North Stand ahead of the 2021–22 season.

West Stand 
The only two-tier stand at the stadium, it consists of a larger lower tier below the upper tier, which consists of corporate hospitality boxes. Also situated on this side of the stadium are hotel rooms, which have a view of the pitch. In the corner between this stand and the South Stand is a police control box. This is the only stand that offers cushioned seats and it also provides seating for directors as well as the media.

East Stand 
The East Stand provided a video screen in the corner by the South Stand until 2018, this corner soon became known as the singers' corner to Coventry fans as first called by Aidy Boothroyd, when he was manager of the Sky Blues. This is where the main cameras are positioned. The stand has been formerly known as the NTL stand and the Tesco Stand. In 2021, in response to Coventry Building Society's sponsorship deal the black seats which previously spelt Ricoh were rearranged to spell Wasps.

South Stand 
This stand is used for away supporters for Coventry City football matches and only opened for rugby matches when needed due to extra demand. However the stand has opened for home supporters in the past for Coventry City fixtures for fixtures against Gillingham and Crewe Alexandra as there was heavy demand by the home support but there was no large followings from the away side. Clubs such as Chelsea, West Ham United, Leicester City, Wolves, Sunderland and Leeds United have sold out the stand in the past. The stand has had previous names in the past, due to sponsors. In October 2018, the capacity of the stand was reduced when a new large screen was installed to replace the previous one situated between the South and East stands

Facilities

Stadium Bowl 

The stadium bowl has a seating capacity of 32,609 with the overall capacity rising to 40,000 for concerts and has easy access to refreshments for customers from the many bar and food outlets around the bowl. Access for production is accessible via two main tunnels on the pitch and the stadium bowl also has back of house facilities meeting artist and production standards.

The Stadium bowl is the main venue for its sporting events as it currently hosts Coventry City's home fixtures as well as hosting top sporting events such as 2012 Olympic Football matches and Heineken Cup semi-finals.

It has also hosted music concerts with Muse, Bon Jovi, Red Hot Chili Peppers, Take That, Bruce Springsteen, Oasis, Pink, Rolling Stones,  Rihanna, Spice Girls and Kings of Leon all performing on the outdoor pitch. Coldplay also performed there with tickets selling out in ninety minutes.

Indoor Arena - Coventry 
The Indoor Arena - Coventry, formerly the Jaguar Exhibition Hall and Ericsson Exhibition Hall, is 6,000 square metres and column-free. The first ever gig at The Coventry Building Society Arena was held in the Exhibition hall when Bryan Adams played to a sell-out 8,000 crowd. The current maximum capacity is 12,000. Florence and the Machine, Scouting for Girls, The Enemy as well as the Specials (twice) have all performed in the hall.

It is also the host to the Champion of Champions snooker competition annually and is home to Netball Superleague side Wasps Netball since February 2017. The hall has also hosted major events such as the Davis Cup in 2013.

Besides Entertainment and Sport the indoor arena is also used as the counting hall for Council and Parliamentary Elections within Coventry and occasionally Nuneaton/Bedworth.

Hotels
The site includes a 121 bedroom DoubleTree by Hilton hotel including 50 rooms with pitch-side views of the stadium bowl. All of the rooms are en-suite as well as coming with access to satellite TV and wi-fi. The Singers Bar & Bistro is available for hotel guests to use, which is divided into a restaurant, bar area and coffee lounge.

A second Hampton by Hilton branded 150-room hotel is due to open at the site from late 2022.

Casino
The casino is built under the ground and has a standalone Show Bar, which has had live entertainment such as Rebecca Ferguson performing. There is a 120-seater poker room as well as other casino games on offer such as blackjack, roulette and slots. There is a gaming lounge, which shows the big televised sporting events.

Club shops 
There are club shops situated at the stadium, where it is possible to buy merchandise and match tickets for all teams. Formerly a Wasps club shop was positioned where the old Coventry City club shop was. Coventry City moved all its staff and stock out of the complex in March 2013. The Wasps shop was relocated to the south side of the venue in 2021 due to construction of the new sports bar. A new combined club shop and ticket office for Coventry City opened ahead of the 2021–22 season, this is the first time Coventry City have had a club shop at the arena since 2013 after relocating the club shop to Gallagher Retail Park and then to the Arena Park Shopping Centre, and the ticket office having been situated at the Butts Park Arena. Coventry opened a second club shop in West Orchards Shopping Centre in July 2022.

Sports Bar 
A 400 square metre sports bar opened at the arena in 2021, located by the front door in the space previously occupied by Wasps' club shop. The bar is named The Anecdote.

Arena Shopping Park 

The Arena Shopping Park is also on the same site of The Coventry Building Society Arena but is not operated by Arena Coventry Limited. It is instead owned by Tesco with a large Tesco Extra store available to customers. Other stores such as Next, New Look, Boots, Marks and Spencer, Currys and Decathlon are also at the shopping park with other smaller unit shops like Game, Clinton Cards and TUI travel agent inside the mall where Tesco Extra is situated.

Accessibility

The stadium is situated on the northern side of Coventry, less than 1 mile south of junction 3 of the M6 motorway, on the A444 road from Coventry to Nuneaton. The railway line between Coventry and Nuneaton is immediately adjacent and Coventry Arena railway station which opened on 18 January 2016. It is located in the small suburb of Rowley's Green, between two larger suburbs, namely Holbrooks to the west, and Longford to the east. The stadium was constructed on the former site of the Foleshill gasworks complex (which fell within the former Foleshill civil parish and, until 1932, Foleshill Rural District), although what is today considered the Foleshill district begins around half a mile to the south-east. The stadium is located within a quarter-mile of the boundary with the borough of Nuneaton and Bedworth and the county of Warwickshire. It is adjacent to the Arena Park Shopping Centre.

From the city centre, National Express Coventry routes 3 & 5 bus go to the Arena Park Shopping Centre. Routes 20, 20A, 20B & 20C, and Stagecoach Midlands Route 48 stop nearby on Foleshill Road. It is also served by Arriva Midlands routes 78 & 78A, and Stagecoach Midlands routes 60 & 703.

When arriving by train to Coventry, the number 8 bus can be caught at the railway station to the Transport Museum. There is a railway station located at the stadium but it was announced in August 2015 that the new station will be closed following major events at the stadium. It was announced that trains will be provided to transport 1,000 extra supporters for the Wasps' fixtures against Harlequins on 28 February and Leicester Tigers on 12 March 2016 as a trial run. London Midland and Wasps will review the trial run before deciding any more decisions with Coventry City "hopeful" that they will eventually benefit from the services.

Attendance

Highest attendances

Top ten sporting attendances 
The table shows the top ten attendances at the Coventry Building Society Arena for sporting events, in order of attendance.

Highest attendances by season 

The table shows the highest attendances of Coventry City and Wasps fixtures each season

Average attendances 
This table shows the average attendances for league matches played at the Coventry Building Society Arena for both Coventry City and Wasps.

References

External links

Official website
London 2012 Olympics profile
Wasps
Coventry City
Coventry Building Society

Coventry City F.C.
Wasps RFC
Rugby union stadiums in England
Sports venues in Coventry
Sports venues completed in 2005
Venues of the 2012 Summer Olympics
Olympic football venues
Darts venues
Snooker venues
2005 establishments in England
Football venues in England
English Football League venues
Netball venues in England
2022 Commonwealth Games venues
Rugby sevens at the 2022 Commonwealth Games
Wrestling at the 2022 Commonwealth Games
Judo at the 2022 Commonwealth Games